Parwati Soepangat (1 May 1932 – 24 July 2016), also known as Maha Upasaka Pandita Metta Pannakusuma Parwati Soepangat Soemarto, was an Indonesian Buddhist figure who established Wanita Buddhis Indonesia (WBI) in 1973 and became the first chairman of WBI.

Parwati was born in Keraton Surakarta from Kanjeng Raden Tumenggung (KRT) Widyonagoro, Regent of Keraton and Raden Ajeng Soewiyah, a teacher in Sekolah Keraton.

In 1958, she graduated from Gajah Mada University. Parwati continued her study in United States. Back to Indonesia, she became a lecturer in Faculty of Psychology in Padjadjaran University and Maranatha Christian University, which located in Bandung.

References

1932 births
Indonesian Buddhists
2016 deaths
Indonesian religious leaders
Gadjah Mada University alumni